The Chicago Red Hots was an amateur roller derby team based in Cicero, Illinois, United States. The club was affiliated with USA Roller Sports under the US Olympic Committee. It was founded on December 11, 2012, by Dakota Prosch (formerly known as Kola Loka), Danielle Henderson (formerly known as Dani GYG) and Fernando Regueiro. The team disbanded after the 2018 season.

References

External links 

 

Red Hots
Roller derby leagues in Illinois
2012 establishments in Illinois